Dean Oliver Aldridge (born 29 July 1994) is an Australian professional baseball pitcher for the Sydney Blue Sox and Canberra Calvary of the Australian Baseball League. He has also played for Team Australia.

Career
He was signed as a non-drafted free agent by the Detroit Tigers on 29 May 2012 and played in the Tigers farm system until he was released following the 2017 season. In March 2018, he was signed as a free agent by the Minnesota Twins, and was assigned to extended spring training before being released at the end of the season.

Aldridge was selected as a member of the Australia national baseball team for the 2019 WBSC Premier12.

References

External links

1994 births
Living people
Baseball pitchers
Gulf Coast Tigers players
Baseball players from Sydney
Sydney Blue Sox players